The Darkest Hour Is Just Before Dawn is the first album by The Birdwatcher, released in 2000. The alias used by Dan Matz, frontman of Windsor for the Derby.

Track listing
 "Cutting Rope" – 2:51
 "First Bright Light" – 10:23
 "Bound to Collide" – 5:54
 "Dawn" – 10:20
 "Little Birdy" – 1:32
 "The Hunt" – 4:41
 "Three Weeks" – 3:20
 "No Expectations" (The Rolling Stones cover) – 5:43

References

External links
Arena Rock Recording Co.

2000 albums
Post-rock albums by American artists
Arena Rock Recording Company albums